The Commander of the Brazilian Air Force is the head of the Brazilian Air Force and the leader of its Aeronautics Command (Comando da Aeronáutica or COMAer). The Commander holds the rank of Tenente-Brigadeiro-do-Ar (lit. Air Lieutenant Brigadier, a 4 star rank), is appointed by the president and reports directly to the Brazilian Minister of Defence. Prior to mid-1999 the Air Force was run by a military Ministry of Aeronautics.

Third and Fourth Brazilian Republics

Military dicatorship (Fifth Brazilian Republic)

Sixth Brazilian Republic

|- align=center
| colspan=7| Commander of the Air Force

Notes

External links
Força Aérea Brasileira - Galeria dos Ex-Ministros e Ex-Comandantes da Aeronáutica

Brazilian Air Force
Air force appointments
Brazil